De Hoop is a gristmill in Abbenbroek, Netherlands. The mill was built in 1843. The mill is a rijksmonument.

References

Flour mills in the Netherlands
Windmills in South Holland
Rijksmonuments in South Holland